Brooklyn Island is an island  long, lying  south of Nansen Island in the eastern part of Wilhelmina Bay, off the west coast of Graham Land. It was discovered by the Belgian Antarctic Expedition under Gerlache, 1897–99, and named after Brooklyn, New York, the home of Dr. Frederick A. Cook, American member of the expedition who served as surgeon, anthropologist, and photographer.

See also 
 List of Antarctic and sub-Antarctic islands

References

 

Islands of Graham Land
Danco Coast